Bernadeth Angela Prentice (born 31 May 1969) is an athlete from Saint Kitts and Nevis.

She was a member of the first ever team to represent Saint Kitts and Nevis at the Olympic Games when she competed in the 4 x 100 metres relay and the 4 x 400 metres relay at the 1996 Summer Olympics. The team failed to finish and came in seventh place in the respective events and so did not qualify for the final.

References

1969 births
Living people
Saint Kitts and Nevis female sprinters
Olympic athletes of Saint Kitts and Nevis
Athletes (track and field) at the 1996 Summer Olympics
Olympic female sprinters